Original Sin – The Seven Sins is a 2021 short film directed by Amy Tinkham and inspired by Dante Alighieri's Inferno. The film stars Autumn Miller and Trevor Jackson and is intertwined with the music of INXS. The film was only available for 48 hours from 16 July on the Veeps platform.

Background and release
The film is a project spearheaded by INXS mentor and manager Christopher Murphy. Murphy told Amy Tinkham to "take the catalogue and make a show out of it, and let the music tell you what to do" and for Amy Tinkham, "Devil Inside" was the starting point.

The film is an adaption of Italian writer Dante Alighieri's 14th century poem Inferno and the spiritual journey via the seven sins of purgatory — pride, envy, wrath, sloth, greed, gluttony and lust. It is seen through the eyes of broken-hearted Jane who starts her quest while isolated during last year's pandemic, to reach hope and identity.

Tinkham said many of the scenes were shot in one take, added the project was meant to be a live show, and one day it will be "with all the acting and dancing, but on a bigger scale".

Tinkham said "This has been a labor of love in every way that one can call something a labor of love, because I have done something I think that is really special and it is also in a way my thank you and my love letter to Chris Murphy and to INXS." Murphy died on 16 January 2021, aged 66.

Cast
 Autumn Miller as Jane
 Trevor Jackson as Boy X
 Fabrice Calmels as The Angel
 Wyatt Stromer as The Ex-boyfriend

Soundtrack

Track listing

References

External links

2021 films
2021 short films
American short films
Films based on Inferno (Dante)
INXS
Seven deadly sins in popular culture
2020s English-language films